The R339 is a Regional Route in South Africa that connects Knysna with Uniondale via Avontuur. It is primarily a gravel road and crosses the Langkloof Mountains at Prince Alfred's pass.

From its southern origin at the N2 in Knysna, it heads north. It meets the north-western terminus of the R340 and heads into the Prince Alfred's Pass. On the other side, it meets the R62 at Avontuur at a staggered interchange. It then heads into another pass, the Uniondale Poort Pass, before reaching Uniondale. At Uniondale it is cosigned with the N9 heading north-east. It diverges from the N9 just north of the town heading north to its origin at the R341.

The tarred section of the road between Avontuur and Uniondale was closed in 2007 due to flood damage but was since re-opened. It is advised that this pass be driven in a 4x4 vehicle, or at minimum a vehicle with high ground clearance.

See also
Keurbooms River

References

External links

 Routes Travel Info
 Prince Alfred's Pass
 Uniondale Poort

Regional Routes in the Western Cape
Gravel roads